Armenia competed at the 2022 Winter Olympics in Beijing, China, from 4 to 20 February 2022.

Armenia's team consisted of six athletes (three per gender) competing in three sports. This doubled the size of the team from 2018. Tina Garabedian and Mikayel Mikayelyan were the country's flagbearer during the opening ceremony. A volunteer served as the flagbearer during the closing ceremony.

Competitors
The following is the list of number of competitors who participated at the Games per sport/discipline.

Alpine skiing

By meeting the basic qualification standards, Armenia qualified one male alpine skier.

Cross-country skiing

Armenia qualified one male and two female cross-country skiers.

Distance

Sprint

Figure skating

In September 2021, at the 2021 CS Nebelhorn Trophy in Oberstdorf, Germany, Armenia qualified a berth in the ice dancing event.

References

Nations at the 2022 Winter Olympics
2022
Winter Olympics